Ermenguer was the first known ruler of the county of Empúries (813-817, attested).

It seems that he was a Goth, a member of the local nobility.  He was given the county when the region was stabilised under the Franks, but it was given to Gaucelm, count of Roussillon, four years later.

Ermenguer seems to be a fictional character, in the same fashion as Charlemagne.

9th-century deaths
Counts of Empúries
9th-century Visigothic people
Gothic warriors
Year of birth unknown
9th-century rulers in Europe